Nabi Misdaq is an Afghan author and a journalist. He was the founder and head of the Pashto Section at BBC World Service in the early 1980s. In 2015, by special decree, and under the 64th article of the constitution, President Ashraf Ghani Ahmadzai, named Nabi Misdaq as his new Media Affairs advisor.

Origins and education 
Misdaq is from the Zazi tribe of Pashtuns, in the Paktia Province of Afghanistan. He went to the United Kingdom on a scholarship in the early 1960s. Misdaq has a BS.c. Hon. from London School of Economics and M.A. and Ph.D. from Sussex University. He has written several books (Afghanistan, Routledge, 2003) and academic papers in English. Recently he finished a Pashto-English dictionary which is due to be published. In the meantime, he is writing a book which contains Afghan jokes translated into English. He is also the author of many articles widely for Afghan exile press in both Pashto and Dari (Persian) over the years.

Career 
Misdaq worked for the BBC World Service at Bush House throughout the 1980s and 1990s, where he founded the Pashto Section, and broadcast regularly, becoming one of the best known voices in Afghanistan and Pakistan. He twice interviewed the exiled Afghan King Zahir Shah in Italy.

Sources 
Misdaq, Nabi - Afghanistan: Political Frailty and External Interference 
Fields, Rona M. - Martyrdom: The Psychology, Theology, and Politics of Self-Sacrifice 
Maley, William - The Afghanistan Wars 
Rais, Rasul Bakhsh - War without Winners: Afghanistan's Uncertain Transition after the Cold War

References

External links
http://www.dgroups.org/groups/worldbank/FMG/index.cfm?op=dsp_showmsg&listname=FMG&msgid=389521&cat_id=13235
http://heartofasia.wordpress.com/2008/04/21/father-of-yoshi-phd/

Pashtun people
Afghan journalists
Afghan expatriates in England
Alumni of the London School of Economics
Alumni of the University of Sussex
Living people
Year of birth missing (living people)